Cherry Smiles – The Rare Singles is a digital only compilation of singles and B-sides released by Nancy Sinatra for Reprise Records, RCA Records, Private Stock Records, Elektra Records from 1970 to 1980. Ten of the tracks were previously only available on 45 RPM singles, and two tracks were previously unavailable in any format.  Cherry Smiles features contributions from Ry Cooder, Duane Eddy, as well as a duet with Lee Hazlewood. It was released September 22, 2009 by Sinatra's own company, Boots Enterprises.

Track listing

Original releases

References

2009 compilation albums
Nancy Sinatra albums
Albums arranged by Billy Strange
Albums produced by Lee Hazlewood